Ryo Sugimoto is President and Representative director of ROJI Co., Ltd.

Born in 1976. Studied under production designers Yohei Taneda] and Mitsuo Harada as an art assistant. Joined NOUVELLE VAGUE Co., Ltd. in 2005. After working as an art designer for "AEGIS"(2005) and "Tokyo Tower: Mom and Me, and Sometimes Dad"(2007), he worked as an art director for "BABEL"(2007), directed by Alejandro Gonzalez Iñarritu which won the 59th Artistic Directors Society Award (Production Design Category) in 2007.

In the same year, he participated in "Chameleon"(2007) directed by Junji Sakamoto as the first production designer. Since then, he has worked as a production designer for "Map of the sounds of Tokyo" (2008) directed by Isabelle Coixet, among others. He has also designed commercials, music videos, and interiors.

He retired from NOUVELLE VAGUE Co., Ltd. in 2021. In September of the same year, he founded ROJI Co., Ltd.

History 
 2021.9 Established the visual art design company "ROJI Co., Ltd.".

Filmography

2001 "9 Souls" / Toshiaki Toyoda: Film director / Art director
2001 "KT" / Junji Sakamoto: Film director / Art director
2003 "Lost in Translation" / Sofia Coppola: Film director / Art director
2003 "KONO YO NO SOTOE CLUB-SHINCHUGUN" / Junji Sakamoto: Film director / Art director
2004 "69" / Lee Sang-il: Film director / Art director
2005 "AEGIS" / Junji Sakamoto: Film director / Art director
2006 "Silk" / Chae Soo-bin: Film director / Art director
2007 "Midnight Eagle" / Izuru Narushima: Film director / Art director
2007 "Tokyo Tower: Mom and Me, and Sometimes Dad" / Joji Matsuoka: Film director / Art director 
2007 "BABEL" / Alejandro González Iñárritu: Film director / Art director
2007 "Chameleon" / Junji Sakamoto: Film director / Production designer
2008 "KANKI NO UTA" / Jōji Matsuoka: Film director / Art director
2008 "Map of the sounds of Tokyo" / Isabel Coixet: Film director / Production designer
2008 "Ultra miracle love story" Satoko Yokohama: Film director / Production designer
2009 "SHINYA SYOKUDO" / Jōji Matsuoka: Film director / Art director
2009 "Kenta & Jun & Kayo-chan no Kuni" / Tatsushi Ōmori: Film director / Production designer
2010 "Villain" / Lee Sang-il: Film director / Production designer
2011 "The Monster Club" / Toshiaki Toyoda: Film director / Production designer
2011 "Gaiji Keisatsu" / Kentarō Horikirizono: Film director / Production designer
2012 "Unforgiven" / Lee Sang-il: Film director / Production designer
2012 "The Wolverine" / James Mangold: Film director / JPN Art director
2013 "A Bolt from the Blue" /  Gekidan Hitori: Film director / Production designer
2016 "If Cats Disappeared from the World" / Akira Nagai: Film director / Art director
2017 "AMY SAID" / Taishi Muramoto: Film director / Production designer
2017 "I hear Blue Hearts" / Lee Sang-il: Film director / Production designer
2018 "Love Is Like After the Rain" / Akira Nagai: Film director / Production designer
2018 "FUNKY" / Yuuya Ishii: Film director / Production designer
2020 "Detective Chinatown 3" / Chen Sicheng: Film director / Production designer
2020 "Eiri" / Kouki Mitani: Film director / Production designer
2020 "DAREKA GA, MITEIRU" / keishi Ōtomo: Film director / Art director
2021 "I Fell in Love Like A Flower Bouquet" / Film director/ Art director
2021 "Character" / Akira Nagai: Film director / Art director

TV commercia.l

TOYOTA / NTT EAST (NIPPON TELEGRAPH AND TELEPHONE EAST CORPORATION) / NTT Docomo / au by KDDI / CHIFURE Cosmetics / SMBC Consumer Finance (former company name: PROMISE) / Asahi Shimbun ….etc.

Music video

EXILE / MAKIDAI / J SOUL BROTHERS ….etc.

Interior design

 "Bar Salon de Shimaji" / Bar / Japan, Nishiazabu, Minato-ku / Designer
 "Bar El Laguito" / Bar / Japan, Arakicho, Shinjuku-ku / Yotsuya 3-chome / Designer
 "BAR ENISI" / Bar / Japan, Kitamachi, Nerima-ku / Designer
 "Bar DICE" / Bar / Japan, Ginza, Chuo-ku / Designer
 "STAR BAR" / Bar / Japan, Ginza, Chuo-ku / Designer
 "BILLY" / Bar / Japan, Arakichō, Shinjuku-ku / Shinjuku Golden Gai / Designer
 "Ne Plus Ultra -Ginza-" / Bar / Japan, Ginza, Chuo-ku / Designer
 "Bar Jusakon" / Bar / Japan, Minami-ku, Sagamihara-shi, Kanagawa / Designer
 "Bar HAGURUMA" / Bar / Japan, Wakamiya-cho, Shinjuku-ku / Kagurazaka / Designer
 "Bar La Hulotte" / Bar / Japan, Motomabu, Minato-ku / Designer
 "-Fish Market lunch- TOTOKICHI" / Washoku / Japan, Shinjuku 3-chome, Shinjuku-ku / Designer
 "Ne Plus Ultra -Roppongi-" / Bar / Japan, Roppongi, Minato-ku / Designer
 "Le Parrain -2-" / Bar / Japan, Shinjuku 3-chome, Shinjuku-ku / Assistant designer
 "Wine Bar Fleur Blanc" / Wine Bar / Japan, Shinjuku 3-chome, Shinjuku-ku / Assistant designer

References

 2007 Art Directors Guild Excellent prize
 2011 The 34th Japan Academy Prize (film) : Excellent art prize
 2013 The 56th Asia Pacific Film Festival : Excellent art Prize
 2014 The 37th Japan Academy Prize (film) : Excellent art prize
 2019 The 59th ACC TOKYO CREATIVE AWARD (Craft Award) : Excellent art prize

External links

 ROJI Co., Ltd.

1976 births
Living people